Clennell is an English surname.

Notable people with this surname include:
 Irene Clennell (born 1964), Singaporean citizen involved in a UK immigration case
 Joe Clennell (1889-1965), English footballer
 John Clennell (1772–1822), English journalist
 Luke Clennell (1781-1840), English engraver
 Paula Clennell, victim in the Ipswich serial murders
 Tony Clennell (born 1951), Canadian potter

References